Sharon Kendrick, née Wirdnam (b. London, England) is a popular British writer of over 100 romance novels published by Mills & Boon since 1993. Her books regularly top the sales charts for romance fiction on both sides of the Atlantic.

Biography
Sharon Wirdnam born in London, England, daughter of Donald Llewelyn Wirdnam, grew up near Heathrow Airport. She has been a waitress, a cook, a photographer and a nurse and she drove an ambulance across the Australian desert. Sharon currently lives and works in Winchester and Plymouth.  She has a daughter and a son.

Publications

As Sharon Kendrick

Single Novels
No Escaping Love (1993)
Cruel Angel (1993)
Sweet Madness (1994)
Potent as Poison (1995)
Savage Seduction (1995)
Passionate Fantasy (1995)
Part-Time Father (1995)
Taking Risks (1996)
Taking It All (1996)
His Baby! (1996)
Untamed Lover (1996)
Mistress Material (1996)
Wait and See (1997)
That Kind of Man (1997)
Long-Distance Marriage (1997)
Make-Over Marriage (1998)
All the Care in the World (1998)
The Baby Bond (1998)
Valentine Vendetta (1999)
The Final Seduction (1999)
Her Secret Pregnancy (2000)
Seduced by the Boss (2000)
The Paternity Claim (2000)
The Sicilian's Passion (2001)
Finn's Pregnant Bride (2002)
Mistress of La Rioja (2002)
Back in the Boss's Bed (2003)
The Greek's Secret Passion (2003)
The Italian's Love-child (2003)
The Billionaire Bodyguard (2004)
Bedded for Revenge (2006)
Bought by Her Husband (2006)
The Sheikh's Unwilling Wife (2007)
The Sheikh's English Bride (2007)
The Desert King's Virgin Bride (2007)
Italian Boss, Housekeeper Bride (2007)
His Majesty's Child (2011)
The Ruthless Greek's Return (2015)

Revenge Is Sweet Series
Getting Even (1997)
Kiss and Tell (1997)
Settling the Score (1997)

Wanted: One Wedding Dress Required!
One Bridegroom Required! (1998)
One Wedding Required! (1999)
One Husband Required! (1999)

London's Most Eligible Playboy Series
The Unlikely Mistress (2001)
Surrender to the Sheikh (2001)
The Mistress's Child (2001)

The Royal House Of Cacciatore Series
The Mediterranean Prince's Passion (2004)
The Prince's Love-Child (2004)
The Future King's Bride (2005)

Desert Brides Series Multi-Author
The Desert Prince's Mistress (2004)

For Love or Money Series Multi-Author
Exposed: The Sheikh's Mistress (2005)

The Balfour Brides Multi Author Series
Kat And The Dare-Devil Spaniard (2010)

Desert Men Of Quarhah Series
Defiant In The Desrte (2013)
Shamed In The Sands (2014)
Seduced By The Sultan (2014)

One Night With Consequences Series Multi-Author
Carrying the Greek's Heir (2015)
Crowned for the Prince's Heir (2016)
Secrets of a Billionaire's Mistress (2017)
The Pregnant Kavakos Bride (2017)
The Italian's Christmas Secret (2017)
Crowned for the Sheikh's Baby (2018)
The Argentinian's Baby of Scandal (2019)

Wedlocked! Series Multi-Author
The Shiek's Bought Wife (2017)

Omnibus In Collaboration
Comfort and Joy (1997) (with Lynne Collins, Marion Lennox and Laura MacDonald)
Christmas Affairs (1998) (with Helen Bianchin and Sandra Marton)
Bachelors' Babies (2001) (with Lynne Graham and Leigh Michaels)
Society Weddings (2002) (with Kate Walker)
Claiming His Mistress (2004) (with Helen Bianchin and Lucy Gordon)
In the Boss's Bed (2004) (with Liz Fielding and Carole Mortimer)
Virgin Brides (2005) (with Miranda Lee and Kate Walker)
In the Sheikh's Bed (2005) (with Michelle Reid and Kate Walker)
Risque Business (2005) (with Emma Darcy and Liz Fielding)
Exclusive! (2005) (with Jackie Braun and Fiona Hood-Stewart)
Millionaires & Mistresses (2006) (with Jackie Braun and Fiona Hood-Stewart)
Latin Affairs (2006) (with Helen Bianchin and Kathryn Ross)
Escape to Spanish Seduction (2006) (with Anne Herries)
Valentine Fantasies: Valentine Vendetta / My Favorite Mistake (2006) (with Stephanie Bond)
Bedded by Her Boss (2007) (with Amanda Browning and Jessica Steele)
Secret Passions (2007) (with Amanda Browning and Catherine Spencer)

As Sharon Wirdnam

Single novels
 Nurse in the Outback (1988)
 To Break a Doctor's Heart (1989)
 Medical Liaison (1990)
 Specialist in Love (1991)
 Seize the Day (1991)
 Surgeon of the Heart (1992)
 Casualty of Passion (1995)
 Consultant Care (1996)
 The Real Christmas Message (2016)

References and Resources
Sharon Kendrick's Official Website
Sharon Kendrick's Webpage in Harlequin Enterprises Ltd's Website
Sharon Kendrick's Webpage in Fantastic Fiction's Website
Sharon Kendrick's webpage in Fiction Database Website

English romantic fiction writers
Living people
English women novelists
Women romantic fiction writers
Year of birth missing (living people)
Writers from London